Rue Basse is a road in the 1st arrondissement of Paris, France. Rue Basse is situated between Place Carrée on one side and Place Basse and Rue des Bons-Vivants on the other side on the -3rd floor of Forum Central of Halles in Forum des Halles.

History 
It was created during the development of Forum Central sector of Halles in Forum des Halles.

Rue Basse got its name on 18 December 1996.

External links
 Rue  Basse (mairie de Paris)

Basse